Kukoč is a Croatian surname. Notable people with the surname include:

Toni Kukoč (born 1968), Croatian basketball player
Tonći Kukoč (born 1990), Croatian footballer
Vedran Kukoč (born 1976), Croatian footballer

Croatian surnames